Mimi Arnold, also known by her married name Mary Arnold-Wheeler,  (born February 27, 1939) is an American former tennis player who was active in the late 1950s and the 1960s.

Personal life
Arnold was born in Hollywood, California, the daughter of tennis player Ethel Burkhardt who played for the United States in the Wightman Cup. Her mother taught her tennis at age 9. She attended Sequoia High School in Redwood City.

Career
At age 11 she won the junior U.S. Hardcourt Championships singles title. She became junior singles champion at the 1957 Wimbledon Championships after beating Rosie Reyes in the final.

Between 1957 and 1968 Arnold competed in five Wimbledon Championships. Her best singles result was reaching the quarterfinal in 1958 where she was lost to sixth-seeded Zsuzsa Körmöczy in three sets. In doubles she reached the quarterfinals in 1966, partnering compatriots Jane Albert. At the U.S. National Championships her best singles result was reaching the third round in 1965 where she was beaten by fifth-seeded and eventual finalist Billie Jean Moffitt.

Like her mother she was selected for the U.S. team in the Wightman Cup, an annual team tennis competition for women contested between the United States and Great Britain. In the 1958 Wightman Cup she played one singles match, against Ann Haydon, which she lost in three sets.

Arnold was inducted into the San Mateo County Sports Hall of Fame in 2007.

References

1939 births
Living people
American female tennis players
People from Hollywood, Los Angeles
Tennis people from California
Tennis players at the 1959 Pan American Games
Pan American Games competitors for the United States
21st-century American women
Grand Slam (tennis) champions in girls' singles
Wimbledon junior champions